Michael Ostini is an Australian former professional rugby league footballer who played in the 1990s. He played for the Balmain Tigers, Eastern Suburbs and the South Sydney Rabbitohs  in the New South Wales Rugby League (NSWRL) competition, Australian Rugby League and NRL competitions.

Background
Ostini played his junior rugby league for Orange CYMS.  In 1994, Ostini was named as the Penrith Panthers under 21 player of the year.

Playing career
Ostini made his first grade debut for the Sydney City Roosters in Round 15 1996 who had just changed their name from Eastern Suburbs, which was the club's name from 1908 to 1995.  Ostini only made 2 appearances for the club before joining arch rivals South Sydney for the 1997 season.

Ostini made 29 appearances for Souths over 2 seasons before joining Balmain for the 1999 season.  Ostini only made 4 appearances for Balmain which was their last season as a stand-alone club before they decided to merge with Western Suburbs to form the Wests Tigers.  Ostini's final game in the top grade was in Round 18 1999 against the Brisbane Broncos which Brisbane won 42–10.

Post playing
In 2004, Ostini became head coach of Orange CYMS who play in the Group 10 competition.

References

1975 births
Living people
Balmain Tigers players
Sydney Roosters players
South Sydney Rabbitohs players
Australian rugby league players
Rugby league props
Rugby league second-rows
Rugby league players from Orange, New South Wales